Did you know.... that there is more than one type of curriculum?

Curriculum studies is a concentration in curriculum and instruction concerned with understanding curricula as an active force of human educational experience. It investigates the relationship between curriculum theory and educational practice in addition to the relationship between school programs, the contours of the society, and culture in which schools are located. Curriculum studies also encompasses the different types of curriculum.

Background
Curriculum studies was created in 1930 and known as the first subdivision of the American Educational Research Association. It was originally created to be able to manage "the transition of the American secondary school from an elite preparatory school to a mass terminal secondary school" until the 1950s when "a preparation for college" became a larger concern. In 1970 the focus of curriculum studies shifted again due to young activist beliefs in incorporating social and cultural aspects. The shift from developing and evaluating curriculum to understanding became known as the "Reconceptualization" of the curriculum field.

Types of curriculum 
A type of curriculum that focuses on how society transmits culture from generation to generation has been tagged with the term "hidden curriculum" For instance, one of the 19th century founders of the discipline of sociology, Émile Durkheim, observed that more is taught and learned in schools than specified in the established curriculum of textbooks and teacher manuals. This curriculum has "non-academic functions and effects" In Moral Education Durkheim wrote:

Children obtain life skills like learning to wait quietly, exercising restraint, putting forth your best effort, completing work, keeping busy, cooperating, showing allegiance to both teachers and peers, being neat and punctual, and so on.

Another type of curriculum that focuses on a child's interests is called emergent curriculum Emergent curriculum has one main goal. That goal is to "create meaningful [learning opportunities] for children" based on those interests. This type of curriculum requires the instructor to consistently implicate certain task and skills for it to be used correctly. These tasks and skills are observations, documentation, creative brainstorming, flexibility, and patience.

 Observations- How does the student react? What was the outcome of using that particular strategy? 
 Documentation- What do you see? 
 Creative brainstorming- How can your students explore their topic of interest further? What are some potential activities?
 Flexibility and Patience- These aspects are needed because the curriculum is constantly undergoing change, growth, and development.

Similar to above, this curriculum also has non- academic benefits. Emergent curriculum is "meant to be culturally responsive and inclusive in nature, so that all children are able to work at their own pace".  Teachers play the role of "[following] the children's lead, [expanding] on their interests, [providing] meaningful and developmentally appropriate materials, and [promoting] independent learning skills". Children take the lead in this curriculum.

A type of curriculum that heavily focuses on "literacy skills and understandings required for college and career readiness in multiple disciplines" is common core curriculum. Common core curriculum has one main goal. That goal is to encourage critical thinking by utilizing the questioning strategy. Students gain a more advanced understanding of the topic as they have to elaborate on their thoughts. Memorization is no longer key. This type of curriculum requires instructors to ask the right kind of questions, depending on one's content area, for it to be effective. 

Types of Ela and Social Studies question include:

 Literal question- a question that children can easily find the answer to 
 Interpretative question- a question that requires children to dig deeper. Students are tasked with interpretating the texts meaning or content.
 Evaluative question- a question that requires students to reflect on the text in a analytical manner. 

Types of Science questions include:

 Convergent question- a question that causes students to utilize basic knowledge. This the type of question lies within a three-tier question system. It should be used first.
 Divergent question- a question that can invoke a variety of responses. This is the type of question lies within a three tier question system. It should be used second.
 Evaluative thinking- a question that can be used to gather ones opinion about the text. This is the type of question lies within a three-tier question system. It should be used third.

Types of Math questions include:

 Procedural- questions that require simple problem solving
 Conceptual- questions that require abstract cognition and thinking regarding math concepts.
 Application- questions that require the use of math skills on real world problems

See also 
Important Curriculum Studies books: The Curriculum: Perspective, Paradigm, and Possibility by William Schubert in addition to Understanding Curriculum by William Pinar, et al. (New York: Peter Lang Publishing, 1995).

External links to university programs
Arizona State University in Tempe, Arizona, USA.
 Ontario Institute for Studies in Education, University of Toronto http://www.oise.utoronto.ca/ctl/Prospective_Students/CTL_Graduate_Programs/Curriculum_Studies_and_Teacher_Development_%28CSTD%29/index.html
 University of British Columbia in Vancouver: www.ubc.ca
 University of Illinois at Chicago: http://www.uic.edu/gcat/EDCIE.shtml#e
University of Wisconsin-Madison: https://ci.education.wisc.edu/research/curriculum-studies-global-studies/
 Monmouth University, West Long Branch, New Jersey: www.monmouth.edu
 Arcadia University, Philadelphia, PA, USA
 Georgia Southern University, Statesboro, GA, USA
 University of Alberta in Edmonton: https://web.archive.org/web/20070116062802/http://www.uofaweb.ualberta.ca/secondaryed/
 North West University, North West, South Africa
 Indiana University, Bloomington, IN: www.iub.edu
 Purdue University: http://www.edci.purdue.edu/curriculum_studies/
 Texas Tech University (Lubbock, TX):  https://www.depts.ttu.edu/education/graduate/curriculum-and-instruction/curriculum_studies_teacher_education.php
 Texas Christian University: https://web.archive.org/web/20140225210058/http://www.coe.tcu.edu/graduate-students-curriculum-studies.asp
 Brock University,St.Catharines,Ontario,Canada: http://www.brocku.ca/education/futurestudents/graduateed/mastersofed/program-description Curriculum Studies is now known as Social and Cultural Contexts of Education (*due to the change of the MEd program requirements commencing in 2008-09 http://www.brocku.ca/webcal/2007/graduate/educ.html)
 Oklahoma State University, Stillwater, OK: http://education.okstate.edu/cied
 Western University, London, ON : https://web.archive.org/web/20160308202142/http://www.edu.uwo.ca/graduate-education/Program%20Brochures/PhD%20-%20Field%20of%20Curriculum%20Studies.pdf
DePaul University, Chicago, Illinois : https://education.depaul.edu/academics/leadership-language-curriculum/graduate/curriculum-studies-phd/Pages/default.aspx
University of North Texas, Denton, Texas: https://www.unt.edu/academics/grad/curriculum-and-instruction-phd

References

Academic disciplines
Curricula
Critical pedagogy